The New River Tunnel, officially known as the Henry E. Kinney Tunnel, is a highway tunnel that carries U.S. Route 1 underneath the New River and Las Olas Boulevard in downtown Fort Lauderdale. The tunnel replaced the Federal Aid Highway Bridge, a drawbridge opened on August 26, 1926, and closed in 1958. Upon its completion in 1960, it was the only operating public tunnel in Florida, until the completion of the Port of Miami Tunnel in 2014, though two private tunnels exist at the Walt Disney World Resort in Lake Buena Vista.  Alfred Spear built the New River Tunnel.  His business, the Thorington Construction Company of Providence, R.I., was responsible for the construction of the project.

The tunnel was built after a lengthy debate on whether to construct another bridge or a tunnel. The predecessor drawbridge operated so slowly that it sometimes took motorists 45 minutes to cross from one end of the bridge to the other, creating massive traffic jams in the heart of the city.

In 1986 it was renamed in honor of Henry E. Kinney, who had advocated its construction while he was chief of the Fort Lauderdale/Broward Edition of the Miami Herald newspaper.

References

External links
 SouthEastRoads, collection of pictures of the Southeastern U.S. highway network

Tunnels in Florida
U.S. Route 1
Transportation in Fort Lauderdale, Florida
Buildings and structures in Fort Lauderdale, Florida
Tunnels completed in 1960
Road tunnels in the United States
1960 establishments in Florida
Transportation buildings and structures in Broward County, Florida